Saint Thomas' Protestant Episcopal Church is a historic Episcopal church dedicated to St. Thomas Aquinas. It was built in 1892 in Eastover, as a simple one-story frame church building, with Gothic Revival style design elements.

It was added to the National Register of Historic Places in 1986.

References

External links 
 Upper South Carolina Episcopal Diocese

Episcopal churches in South Carolina
Churches on the National Register of Historic Places in South Carolina
Carpenter Gothic church buildings in South Carolina
Churches completed in 1892
19th-century Episcopal church buildings
Churches in Richland County, South Carolina
African-American history of South Carolina
National Register of Historic Places in Richland County, South Carolina